This list of rail trails in Michigan lists former railroad rights-of-way in Michigan that have been converted to rail trails for public use. A rail trail may still include rails, such as light rail or streetcar. By virtue of their characteristic shape (long and flat), some shorter rail trails are known as greenways and linear parks. , Michigan has the most total mileage (2,381) of any state.

Upper Peninsula

Northern Michigan

West Michigan

Central Michigan and the Thumb

Southwest Michigan

Southeast Michigan and Metro Detroit

Images

See also 
 List of rail trails in the United States
 List of Michigan state parks
 Rails with trails

References 

 Michigan transportation-related lists
 Rail trails in Michigan
Michigan